= Robert Rave =

American book author and writer

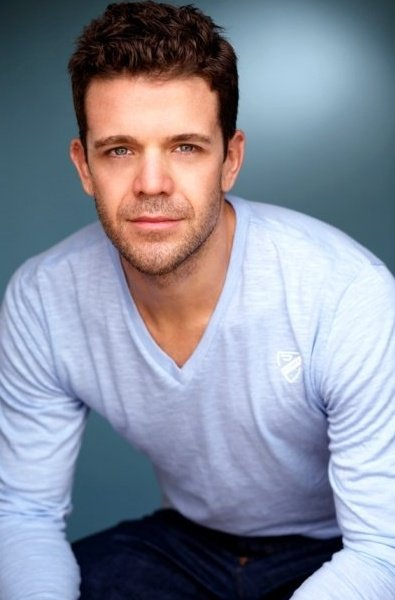
- Born: Robert Rave; Bloomington, Illinois
- Education: Bachelor of Fine Arts at Illinois Wesleyan University

Robert Rave is an American book author and writer.

== Career ==
He earned his Bachelor of Fine Arts at Illinois Wesleyan University majoring in English. After graduating in 1996, he began his career as a New York City-based publicist working on numerous public relations campaigns and events in the fashion and entertainment industries.

In 2004, he moved to Los Angeles and began writing full-time. In 2009 St. Martin's Press published Spin: A Novel centered on Taylor Green, a young man from the Midwest, who stumbles into New York without a clue or a contact and later is hired by the outrageous, Jennifer Weinstein, the city's most notorious public relations diva.

== Books ==
- (2009) Spin: A Novel, St. Martin's Press
- (2010) Waxed, St. Martin's Press
